Imperatritsa Ekaterina Velikaya ( (Empress Catherine the Great)) was the second of three  dreadnoughts built for the Imperial Russian Navy during World War I. Completed in 1915, she was assigned to the Black Sea Fleet. She engaged the ex-German battlecruiser Yavûz Sultân Selîm once, but only inflicted splinter damage while taking no damage herself. The ship briefly encountered an Ottoman light cruiser, but mostly covered the actions of smaller ships during the war without firing her guns. These included minelaying operations off the Bosporus and anti-shipping sweeps of the coast of Anatolia. Imperatritsa Ekaterina Velikaya was renamed Svobodnaya Rossiya (Free Russia) after the February Revolution of 1917.

She was evacuated from Sevastopol as German troops approached the city in May 1918, but was scuttled in Novorossiysk harbor the following month when the Germans demanded that the Soviets hand her over according to the terms of the Treaty of Brest-Litovsk. Svobodnaya Rossiya was only partially salvaged after the war.

Description
Awarded the contract for one of the three Black Sea battleships authorized in 1911, the Associated Factories and Shipyards of Nikolayev (ONZiV) lacked an experienced design staff of its own, the company hired the British shipbuilder Vickers Limited to assist with the process of producing detailed drawings from the preliminary sketch design. Based on the historic tendency for Russian ships to be overweight, the Vickers consultants suggested that the ship's hull be enlarged to create a greater reserve of buoyancy and the Naval Ministry agreed despite the additional costs involved. Her exact draft is not known, but she had a draft of  during her sea trials. The lead ship of the class, had proven to be very bow-heavy in service and tended to take large amounts of water through her forward casemates. The ammunition for Imperatritsa Ekaterina Velikayas forward  guns was reduced from 100 to 70 rounds each while the ammunition for the forward  guns was reduced from 245 to 100 rounds per gun in a successful attempt to compensate for her trim. This was successful because Imperatritsa Ekaterina Velikayas longer length meant that she was less affected by the trim problem to begin with.

All of her electrical power was generated by four primary Curtis  turbo generators and two  auxiliary units.

Armament and protection
Her main battery consisted of a dozen Obukhovskii 12-inch Pattern 1907 guns mounted in four triple turrets distributed over the length of the ship. Her secondary armament consisted of 10 130 mm B7 Pattern 1913 guns mounted in hull-mounted casemates. They were arranged in two groups, six guns per side from the forward turret to the rear funnel and the remaining four clustered around the rear turret. Imperatritsa Ekaterina Velikaya was also fitted with three  anti-aircraft guns, one mounted on the roof of the fore turret and two side by side on the aft turret. The ship was fitted with four  submerged torpedo tubes, two tubes on each broadside.

Service
Imperatritsa Ekaterina Velikaya was built by the ONZiV Shipyard at Nikolayev. She was laid down on 30 October 1911 as Ekaterina II, but this was just a ceremonial event as neither the design had been finalized nor the contract signed. ONZiV decided, on advice from Vickers, to increase her dimensions over those of her sisters to prevent her from being overweight. This added over two million gold rubles to her cost and delayed the start of her construction three months past her half-sisters. She was launched on 6 June 1914, renamed on 27 June 1915, and completed on 18 October. She ran her trials over the remainder of the year.

Three days later she encountered the Yavûz Sultân Selîm at long range. The battlecruiser was in pursuit of the Russian destroyers  and  after they had sunk the  collier  earlier that morning. The destroyers had alerted Imperatritsa Ekaterina Velikaya which had increased her speed in an attempt to intercept the faster Ottoman ship. Imperatritsa Ekaterina Velikaya fired 96 shells from her longer-ranged guns, but inflicted only splinter damage on Yavûz Sultân Selîm before she pulled out of range. Imperatritsa Ekaterina Velikaya was escorting three seaplane carriers to attack Varna, Bulgaria, on 9 March when the operation was cancelled after a destroyer reconnoitering the harbor struck a mine and sank. At the end of the month, she helped to cover the movement of 36 transports from Odessa to Novorossiysk in preparation for an amphibious landing the next month. The battleship may have briefly engaged the light cruiser  on 4 April, firing at the smaller ship for about 15 minutes with little effect before she was able to disengage. Other sources, however, state that the Ottoman ship actually encountered Imperatritsa Mariya.

Three months later Imperatritsa Ekaterina Velikaya and her half-sister Imperatritsa Mariya, alerted by intercepted radio transmissions, sortied from Sevastopol in an attempt to intercept Yavuz and Midilli as they returned from a bombardment of the Russian port of Tuapse on 4 July. The Ottoman ships dodged north and avoided the Russians by paralleling the Bulgarian coastline back to the Bosporus. Imperatritsa Ekaterina Velikaya escorted another seaplane carrier attack on Varna harbor on 25 August; German aircraft counterattacked and damaged one of the escorting destroyers. On 11 October 1916, she ran aground off Sevastopol. She was refloated and taken in to Sevastopol for repairs.

1917–1918
Together with three pre-dreadnought battleships and the protected cruiser , the battleship patrolled off the northwestern coast of Anatolia on 5–9 January 1917, helping to sink 39 sailing cargo ships. Escorted by three destroyers and Pamiat Merkuria, Imperatritsa Ekaterina Velikaya cruised off the Anatolian coast on 23–25 February and her escorts sank 3 sailing ships. After the February Revolution she was renamed Svobodnaya Rossiya ("Free Russia") on 29 April. She was part of the covering force for minelaying operations off the mouth of the Bosporus on 17–24 May. While covering another such operation a month later, the ship briefly engaged Midilli on 25 June as the cruiser was returning from a minelaying sortie off the mouths of the Danube River. Svobodnaya Rossiya was only able to fire nine salvos from her forward turret without effect before the much faster Midilli was able to disengage. On 24 August Svobodnaya Rossiya helped to screen a raid on the harbor of the Anatolian city of Ordu. The ship was ordered to intercept Midilli on 1 November, but the crew refused to participate and returned to Sevastopol. The navy ceased offensive operations against the Central Powers in early November in response to the Bolshevik Decree on Peace before a formal Armistice was signed the next month.

The ship sailed from Sevastopol to Novorossiysk on 30 April 1918 as German troops approached the city. Svobodnaya Rossiya was scuttled on 19 June by four torpedoes fired by the destroyer  in Novorossiysk harbor to prevent her from being turned over to the Germans as required by the Treaty of Brest-Litovsk. The fourth torpedo caused a massive explosion and she capsized and sank in four minutes. No attempt was made to salvage her during the 1920s, but the 12-inch shells were salvaged from her wreck. Explosive charges were used to gain access to her magazines until one day in 1930 when a charge set off a torpedo warhead, which caused a nearby powder magazine to explode, throwing a column of water  into the air. No one was injured, but work of this type ceased, although parts of her engines and boilers were later salvaged.

Notes

Footnotes

Bibliography

External links

Brief article and specifications
Short article from Black Sea Fleet webpage

Imperatritsa Mariya-class battleships
World War I battleships of Russia
1914 ships
Maritime incidents in 1916
Maritime incidents in 1918
Ships built at the Black Sea Shipyard
Scuttled vessels
World War I shipwrecks in the Black Sea
Ships built in the Russian Empire